Dantrell is a given name. Notable people with the given name include:

Dantrell Davis (1985–1992), American murder victim
Dantrell Savage (born 1985), American football player

See also
Dontrell
Dontrelle

Masculine given names